William J. Stewart (July 12, 1950 – March 7, 2016) was a member of the Pennsylvania State Senate, serving from 1987 to 1996.

References

Democratic Party Pennsylvania state senators
Democratic Party members of the Pennsylvania House of Representatives
2016 deaths
1950 births
Politicians from Johnstown, Pennsylvania